Kronach is a town in Upper Franconia, Bavaria, Germany, capital of the eponymous district.

Kronach may also refer to:
Kronach (district), a Landkreis (district) in Bavaria, Germany
Kronach (Haßlach), a river of Bavaria, Germany, tributary of the Haßlach
Kronach (White Main), a river of Bavaria, Germany, tributary of the White Main
Kronach, a district of the town Fürth in Bavaria, Germany